Jill A. Macoska is an American scientist and professor. She is the Alton J. Brann endowed chair and distinguished professor of science and mathematics at the University of Massachusetts Boston.

Education 
Macoska earned a B.A. in physical anthropology from Kent State University  (1978).  She holds an M.Phil. (1986) and  Ph.D. in biochemistry (1988) from the City University of New York. She completed postdoctoral work at Harvard University in molecular genetics and at the Michigan Cancer Foundation.

Career and research 
Macoska is the Alton J. Brann Distinguished Professor in Science and Mathematics, and Professor of Biological Sciences at University of Massachusetts Boston. For the past 20 years, her research has focused on elucidating the molecular genetic alterations and dysfunctional intracellular signaling mechanisms that promote prostate pathobiology. Macoska serves as the first director of the Center for Personalized Cancer Therapy.

References 

20th-century American biochemists
21st-century American biochemists
20th-century American women scientists
21st-century American women scientists
Year of birth missing (living people)
Living people
City University of New York alumni
University of Massachusetts Boston faculty
Women biochemists
American geneticists
American women geneticists
American women academics

Kent State University alumni